TWY, or twy, may refer to:
 Taxiway
 The Wonder Years, an American television comedy-drama
 TWY, the IATA code for Tawa Airport in Papua New Guinea
 twy, the ISO 639-3 code for the Lawangan language spoken in Indonesia
 TWY, the National Rail code for Twyford railway station in the county of Berkshire, UK

See also